Two destroyers of the Imperial Japanese Navy have been named :

 , lead ship of her class of the Imperial Japanese Navy during the Russo-Japanese War

See also 
 Shinonome (disambiguation)
 Shinonome-class destroyer, also called , a class of destroyer of the Imperial Japanese Navy

Imperial Japanese Navy ship names
Japanese Navy ship names